George Buchan Ogilvie  (5 March 1931 – 5 April 2020) was a prolific Australian theatre director and actor, who also worked as a director and actor within film and television.

Life and career 
George Ogilvie began as an actor at the Canberra Repertory Theatre, and eventually moved to the United Kingdom where he trained, taught and acted. In 1965, he returned to Australia to take up the position of associate director with the Melbourne Theatre Company, where he stayed for six years. He then worked as artistic director at the South Australian Theatre Company for four years, followed by 12 years as part of the subsidised theatre network. In 1988 he became a freelance director, working with the Australian Opera, the Australian Ballet and various theatre companies.

His television credits include the 1983 miniseries The Dismissal (where he played the Labor Senator Jim McClelland), the miniseries Bodyline (1984) (where he was one of the writers and also directed three of the seven episodes), and direction of the TV films The Shiralee (1987), Touch the Sun: Princess Kate (1988), The Battlers (1994), two episodes of the miniseries The Feds (1994), and 11 episodes of the long-running police series Blue Heelers between 2002 and 2006.

His film credits include Mad Max Beyond Thunderdome (1985), which he directed together with George Miller, Short Changed (1985), the much awarded The Place at the Coast (1987), and The Crossing (1990), where Russell Crowe was first seen on the screen.

George Ogilvie regularly taught and directed at NIDA and Actors Centre Australia. In 1983 he was appointed a Member of the Order of Australia (AM) in the 1983 Queen's Birthday Honours for his services to the theatre and the performing arts.

In 2006, the Australian performing arts association Currency House published his autobiography: Simple Gifts – a life in the theatre.

He died, aged 89, on 5 April 2020.

Books

References

External links
Actors Centre Australia: George Ogilvie biography Retrieved 2013-03-09

National Library of Australia: Papers of George Ogilvie, 1943–2006 Retrieved 2013-03-09

1931 births
2020 deaths
Australian film directors
Australian television directors
Australian theatre directors
Australian male film actors
Australian male television actors
Australian male stage actors
Members of the Order of Australia